Welsh Wrestling is the only national Welsh professional wrestling promotion.

Overview

Welsh Wrestling is the national Welsh professional wrestling promotion, holding live professional wrestling events across Wales. 

The wrestling is hybrid of American wrestling and traditional British wrestling, with contests most often contested under 'one-fall' rules. Each match is overseen by a referee, dressed in traditional bow-tie and shirt, with a smartly-attired MC.

Wrestlers on the card will typically be larger-than-life, both in persona and physique – with the heroes drawing influence from wrestling stars like Hulk Hogan, Big Daddy and Rey Mysterio and the villains bringing with them traits popularized by past performers Kendo Nagasaki, Ravishing Rick Rude, Superstar Billy Graham and others.

Throughout each year, the roster perform in front of several thousand fans at primarily theatre-based venues. The live events run around two hours in duration, with a short interval, and are typically headlined by either a Battle Royal, Royal Rumble or multi-man tag team match, with an array of singles bouts on the undercard.

At the conclusion of each event, Welsh Wrestling offers a Backstage Pass – allowing spectators to meet the evening's wrestlers, take photographs with them and collect autographs. Traditional wrestling merchandise, including foam hands, is commonplace at the shows, and adds to the colorful, carnival-like atmosphere.

The Welsh Wrestling touring roster has showcased wrestlers with experience from WWE, TNA Wrestling, National Wrestling Alliance, Ohio Valley Wrestling and promotions across Europe. WWE NXT athletes Oliver Grey and Gavin Reid worked extensively for Welsh Wrestling prior to signing their developmental contracts and moving to the United States.

In 2017, Ravenhill set up the Welsh Wrestling Training Academy, based in Morfa, Swansea.

International stars

In the early days of Welsh Wrestling, international talents including Billy Kidman, Chad Collyer and Joe E. Legend were brought in for various big events. However, in recent years the promotion has maintained a policy of promoting quality domestic talent. Among the WWE superstars to have plied their trade in a Welsh Wrestling ring are the former Intercontinental Champion, Wade Barrett, as well as Mark Andrews, Pete Dunne and others. Promoter Alan Ravenhill also helped to introduce former Impact Wrestling star Rob Terry to the wrestling business, after a chance encounter in the Swansea area in the mid-2000s. Through his association with Orig Williams, Ravenhill has been a long-time advocate of North Wales grappler Mason Ryan, who has also wrestled on the Welsh Wrestling circuit.

Celebrity involvement
In 2012, former Liberal Democrat MP and media personality Lembit Opik became embroiled in a feud with Kade Callous, with the dispute covered by The Guardian,The Daily Express, The Daily Mirror, Metro, The Independent, The Telegraph and The Huffington Post.

The key incidents between the two, culminating in a tag team match at Welshpool Town Hall, drew television coverage on both BBC News and ITN News, as well as entertainment programmes The Wright Stuff and Have I Got News For You. National radio station talkSPORT also covered the story, which appeared on the MSN, AOL and Orange websites and spread as far as Albania, Croatia and Opik's homeland of Estonia.

Premiership footballer and Wales captain Ashley Williams has also appeared in Welsh Wrestling, participating in an in-ring angle with Mean Tommy Dean.

Venues

South Wales
Aberdare Coliseum
Abergavenny Borough Theatre
Ammanford Miners Theatre
Barry Memorial Hall
Bedwas Workman's Hall
Blaengarw Workman's Hall
Blaenavon Workman's Institute
Blackwood Miners Institute
Bridgend Recreation Centre
Brynmawr Market Hall Cinema
Cardiff St. David's Hall
Caldicot Leisure Centre
Carmarthen Lyric Theatre
Cwmaman Institute
Cwmbran Congress Theatre
Ferndale Rhondda Fach Sports Centre 
Gilfach Goch GGCA
Llandeilo Civic Hall
Llanelli Y Ffwrnes
Llanhilleth Institute
Llantrisant Leisure Centre
Maesteg Town Hall
Merthyr Tydfil Dowlais Centre
Monmouth Blake Theatre
Newport Centre
Pontardawe Leisure Centre
Pontypridd Muni Arts Centre
Porthcawl Grand Pavilion
Port Talbot Princess Royal Theatre
Swansea Penyrheol Theatre
Tonyrefail The Savoy Theatre
Ystradgynlais Welfare Hall

Mid, North and West Wales
Aberystwyth Plascrug Leisure Centre
Anglesey Beaumaris Theatre
Bala Neuadd Buddug
Blaenau Ffestiniog Moelwyn Leisure Centre
Brecon Theatr Brycheiniog
Builth Wells Wyeside Arts Centre
Caernarfon Arfon Leisure Centre
Carmarthen Lyric Theatre
Colwyn Bay Leisure Centre
Fishguard Theatr Gwaun
Harlech Castle
Knighton Community Centre
Lampeter Victoria Hall
Llandrindod Wells Sports Centre
Llangollen Town Hall
Llanrwst Dyffryn Conwy Leisure Centre
Machynlleth Bro Ddyfi Leisure Centre
Narberth Queen's Hall
Newtown Elephant and Castle Hotel
Pembroke Dock Pater Hall
Porthmadog Y Ganolfan
Rhyl Pavilion Theatre
Rhayader Leisure Centre
Welshpool Town Hall
Wrexham Stiwt Theatre

Holiday camps
New Quay Quay West
Tenby Kiln Park
Trecco Bay Holiday Park

Grand Slam Wrestling

Welsh Wrestling also hold wrestling events in England under the Grand Slam Wrestling banner, in towns including Abingdon, Bude, Banbury, Brackley, Cheltenham, Crewe, Colne, Congleton, Craven Arms, Didcot, Eastbourne, Henley-on-Thames, Kidlington, Kettering, Newbury, Oswestry, Ormskirk, Oxford, Plymouth, Poole, Reading, Walburton, Witney and Weymouth. These shows typically use a similar structure, ethos and talent pool as the Welsh Wrestling shows.

Roster

The Welsh Wrestling touring roster typically consists of 8–12 heavyweight and super heavyweight wrestlers at any one time, with light heavyweights and guest talent featuring often as further attractions. Women's matches are a rarity in Welsh Wrestling, but have been known to occur as a special attraction.

Super heavyweights

Big Dog 
Bison Brody

Heavyweights
Eddie Ryan 
James Mason 
John 'The Machine' Titan 
'Mean' Tommy Dean 
'Mr. Irresistible' Iestyn Rees 
Rocco Berretta 
Stevie Starr 
Tagori
'The Fame' Robbie Caine

Light heavyweights
Jay Russo
Kid Cymru
Magico
Sparky
Sterling Gold, Esq.

Welsh Heavyweight Championship

History

The inaugural Welsh Heavyweight Champion was crowned at a special "King of the Castle" tournament in Harlech on 1 May 2010, run in association with Cadw at the Harlech Castle site. The six-man tournament consisted of three singles matches, which saw contenders Dafydd Rhys, The Saint and JD Knight eliminated. The final match was contested under triangle rules, and saw James Mason defeat both Kade Callous and Danny Garnell to win the championship. The present Welsh Heavyweight Champion is Big Dog while Kade Callous holds the record for longevity, with a reign of 480 days.

Champions

Affiliation

Welsh Wrestling is Wales' representative in the UEWA (Union of European Wrestling Alliances), which recognizes the Welsh Heavyweight Championship as the country's premier title. As part of their membership, the promotion has hosted one of the few European Heavyweight Championship title matches on UK soil and sent light heavyweight standout Wild Boar to represent them at the inaugural European Cruiserweight Championship tournament in Oslo, Norway.

See also

Professional wrestling in the United Kingdom
List of professional wrestling promotions in the United Kingdom

References

External links
Official website

British professional wrestling promotions
Entertainment companies established in 2004
Entertainment companies of the United Kingdom
2004 establishments in Wales